Vas owadai is a moth of the family Erebidae first described by Michael Fibiger in 2010. It is known from northern Thailand.

The wingspan is about 11 mm. The head, patagia, tegulae, thorax, and ground colour of the forewing is brown. The costal quadrangular patch of medial area and terminal area are dark brown. The forewing is long and narrow, with a pointed apex. The crosslines are all present, though indistinctly marked. The terminal line is marked by black interneural dots. The hindwing is light grey, with an indistinct discal spot. The underside of the forewing is brown grey and the underside of the hindwing is light grey, with a discal spot.

References

Micronoctuini
Moths described in 2010
Taxa named by Michael Fibiger